The Traralgon Marathon is an annual marathon road running event held in Traralgon, Victoria, Australia.  It has been held every year since 1968, and is the "oldest continuously run marathon in Australia" .  The race is organised by the Traralgon Harriers Athletic Club.

History 

A total of 18 runners finished out of an initial field of 34.

In 1978, Patricia Cooper became the first woman to run the Traralgon Marathon.  She had only taken up running the year before, and completed the race with a finish time of 3:41:29.

Because of the pandemic, the course was changed, and contenders were limited to members of the Traralgon Harriers Athletic Club. A total of 13 runners finished the marathon that year.

Course 

The course has changed a number of times but has been run in an out and back format starting from the Traralgon Recreation Reserve & Showgrounds out to Toongabbie for many years, moving away from the main road onto the rail trail in 2016 but still essentially following the same route.

Winners 

 Source:

Notes

References

External links 
 Traralgon Marathon Site

Recurring sporting events established in 1968
Marathons in Australia
Annual sporting events in Australia
1968 establishments in Australia